"In the Mix" is a song by American singer and songwriter Mariah Carey. It was released on September 17, 2019 as the official theme song of the American TV series Mixed-ish, that premiered on September 24, 2019 on ABC. The song's music was composed by Carey along with songwriter-producer Daniel Moore II, and the lyrics and melody were written by Carey. It was also co-produced by Carey and Moore. The accompanying music video was released the same day as the single's release, featuring clips from Mixed-ish, as well as footage of Carey and her children in the recording studio.

Background and release 

On August 5, 2019, Carey confirmed that she will release "In the Mix", serving as the series' theme song. The song was written and recorded around July and August of that year. Carey's children, Moroccan and Monroe provided background vocals to the song. Her musical director at the time, songwriter-producer Daniel Moore II co-produced the song along with Carey.

On September 17, 2019, Carey debuted the song to partygoers at the "Embrace Your Ish" premiere event at Goya Studios in Los Angeles alongside Mixed-ish creators Kenya Barris and Tracee Ellis Ross.

Critical reception 
Althea Legaspi from Rolling Stone called the chorus “uplifting”, and described Carey’s whistle register as “tingly”.

Music video 
On September 17, 2019, the accompanying music video was released on ABC's YouTube channel and features clips from the show, as well as footage of Carey and her children recording the song in the studio.

Charts

Weekly charts

References 

2019 songs
Mariah Carey songs
Television drama theme songs
Black-ish
Songs written by Mariah Carey